Diaphus minax is a species of lanternfish found in Cuba.

References

Myctophidae
Taxa named by Basil Nafpaktitis
Fish described in 1968